CIOC-FM (98.5 MHz), is a commercial FM radio station in Victoria, British Columbia. It is owned by Rogers Sports & Media and it broadcasts an adult contemporary format, switching to Christmas music for much of November and December. Its radio studios are located at 817 Fort Street in Downtown Victoria.

CIOC-FM has an effective radiated power (ERP) of 100,000 watts, the maximum for most Canadian FM stations. The transmitter is off Fulton Road in Victoria.

History
In 1955, the station signed on as CKDA-FM. It simulcast the signal of then-AM sister station CKDA using 370 watts of power, with both stations owned by Capital Broadcasting System Ltd. The original transmitter was located in the "rack-room" of CKDA's studios. The FM transmitter was the studio transmitter link to the AM transmitter site on Chatham Island.

In compliance with revised government regulations discouraging simulcasting, CKDA-FM became CFMS-FM at 6:00 PM on March 21, 1965. It began broadcasting separate programming, an easy listening format between noon and midnight seven days a week before later going to an 18-hour-a-day schedule (7:00 a.m. to 1:00 a.m.) in May 1966. It later switched to a 24-hour-a-day broadcasting schedule. It aired quarter hour sweeps of mostly soft instrumental cover versions of popular songs.

In later years, CFMS switched to a mixed format of adult contemporary music (from 6:00 AM–7:00 PM weekdays and 6:00 AM–6:00 PM weekends) and easy listening instrumentals (in the evenings and overnight).

On September 1, 1995, Capital Broadcasting sold CKDA and CFMS, with CKDA going to OK Radio Group, the owners of CKKQ-FM, and CFMS picked up by CJVI (owned by Rogers Communications). On December 11, CFMS changed to its current full-time adult contemporary format and switched its call sign to the current CIOC.

On March 25, 2010, CIOC was denied by the CRTC to add a new FM transmitter at Saltspring Island. If the application was approved, the new transmitter at Saltspring Island would have broadcast on 98.5 MHz, the same frequency as CIOC's main transmitter in Victoria.
On September 13, 2010, the station reapplied to add a repeater at Saltspring Island and received Canadian Radio-television and Telecommunications Commission approval on February 23, 2011.

References

External links
Ocean 98.5

CFMS/CIOC history at Vancouver Radio Museum

Ioc
Ioc
Ioc
Radio stations established in 1955
1955 establishments in British Columbia